John Fothergill may refer to:

John Fothergill (physician) (1712–1780), English physician and botanist
John Fothergill (merchant) (1730–1782), English merchant
John Fothergill (engineer) (born 1953), English engineer
John Milner Fothergill (1841–1888), medical writer
John Fothergill (innkeeper) (1876–1957), gentleman innkeeper
John Fothergill (priest) (1808–1851), Archdeacon of Berbice